Marguerite Volant is a Canadian television drama series first aired in 1996.

Cast
Catherine Sénart as Marguerite Volant
Michael Sapieha as James Elliot Chase
Normand D'Amour as Laval Chevigny
Phillipe Cousineau as Antoine de Courval
Veronique Le Flaguais as Isabeau de Rouville
Gilbert Sicotte as Claude Volant
Pascale Bussieres as Eleanore Volant
Stéphane Gagnon as Lambert Volant
Angele Coutu as Eugénie Beaubassin
Jean-Emery Gagnon as Vincent Léry
Pierre Curzi as Renaud Larochelle
Benoît Dagenais as Père Godefroy Volant
Pascale Montpetit as Jeanne Letellier
Benoît Briére as Blaise Melancon

External links
 

1990s Canadian drama television series
1996 Canadian television series debuts
Ici Radio-Canada Télé original programming
1996 Canadian television series endings